Mario Aldo Montano (born 1 May 1948) is an Italian fencer. He won a gold and two silver medals in the team sabre at three Olympic Games.

He is the son of fencer Aldo Montano who competed for Italy at the 1936 and 1948 Summer Olympics. His son, also called Aldo Montano, competed at the 2004, 2008 and 2012 Summer Olympics.

See also
Italy national fencing team – Multiple medallist

References

External links
 

1948 births
Living people
Italian male fencers
Olympic fencers of Italy
Fencers at the 1972 Summer Olympics
Fencers at the 1976 Summer Olympics
Fencers at the 1980 Summer Olympics
Sportspeople from Livorno
Olympic gold medalists for Italy
Olympic silver medalists for Italy
Olympic medalists in fencing
Medalists at the 1972 Summer Olympics
Medalists at the 1976 Summer Olympics
Medalists at the 1980 Summer Olympics
20th-century Italian people